Waldemar Schanz (born 9 August 1968) is a German sport shooter who competed in the 1996 Summer Olympics, in the 2000 Summer Olympics, and in the 2004 Summer Olympics.

References

1968 births
Living people
German male sport shooters
Trap and double trap shooters
Olympic shooters of Germany
Shooters at the 1996 Summer Olympics
Shooters at the 2000 Summer Olympics
Shooters at the 2004 Summer Olympics
21st-century German people